Erigeron algidus is a species of flowering plant in the family Asteraceae known by the common name stalked fleabane.

Erigeron algidus is native to the High Sierra and nearby peaks in eastern California and western Nevada.Biota of north America Program 2014 county distribution map It is a resident of alpine plant communities such as talus slopes.

Erigeron algidus a daisy-like perennial with a basal clump of narrow fuzzy leaves and erect, naked stems to 30 centimeters (1 foot) in height. Atop each stem is a flower head one to one and a half centimeters (0.4-0.6 inches) wide with a yellow center of disc florets and an outer fringe of up to 125 ray florets in shades of bright purple, pink, or white. The rays spread straight out or reflex back from the center.

References

External links
Jepson Manual Treatment
United States Department of Agriculture Plants Profile
Calphotos Photo gallery, University of California

algidus
Flora of California
Flora of Nevada
Plants described in 1925